Baatarjavyn Shoovdor (born 20 November 1990) is a Mongolian freestyle wrestler. She is a three-time bronze medalist at the World Wrestling Championships.

Career 

At the 2014 Asian Wrestling Championships she won the silver medal in the women's 58 kg event. At the 2018 Asian Wrestling Championships she won one of the bronze medals in the women's 59 kg event.

At the 2019 World Wrestling Championships held in Nur-Sultan, Kazakhstan, she won one of the bronze medals in the women's 59 kg event. She also won one of the bronze medals in this event at the 2018 World Wrestling Championships held in Budapest, Hungary.

At the Golden Grand Prix Ivan Yarygin 2020 held in Krasnoyarsk, Russia, she won the gold medal in the women's 59 kg event. In 2022, she won one of the bronze medals in the women's 59 kg event at the Golden Grand Prix Ivan Yarygin held in Krasnoyarsk, Russia.

Achievements

References

External links 

 

Living people
1990 births
Place of birth missing (living people)
Mongolian female sport wrestlers
World Wrestling Championships medalists
Asian Wrestling Championships medalists
21st-century Mongolian women